The Church of St. Mary of the Perpetual Assistance located in Tarnopol, Eastern Galicia (now Ternopil, Ukraine), was a church located in the city's centre which functioned as the parochial church of Ternopil's Roman Catholic community.

The church was built by the Latin Deacon of Ternopil and local rector, prelate Bolesław Twardowski, in the years 1903–1908, as a parish church for the city. The design of the neo-gothic church was made by Teodor Talowski. It was one of his alternative projects for the Church of St. Elizabeth in Lviv.

As a result of World War II, the city was annexed by the Soviet Union. The local Polish Catholic population was transferred or expelled  in line with the new Polish frontier. The local Soviet authorities decided to demolish the church, and on their orders it was blown up in 1954. Later, a department store was erected on the site.

1908 establishments in Austria-Hungary
Buildings and structures demolished in 1954
Churches in Ternopil
Demolished churches in Ukraine
Gothic Revival church buildings in Ukraine
Shrines to the Virgin Mary
Polish diaspora in Europe
Roman Catholic churches in Ukraine
Roman Catholic churches completed in 1908